Paradoks is an album by Turkish bağlama artist Ahmet Koç. The artist covers some well-known pop songs, playing his bağlama.

Track listing 
"Hasta Siempre" (Carlos Puebla)
"Fragile" (Gordon Sumner)
"My Way" (Paul Anka, Claude François, Jacques Revaux)
"Sorry Seems to Be the Hardest Word" Bernie Taupin, Elton John)
"Hotel California" (Don Felder, Glenn Frey, Don Henley)
"Surf Rider" (Nokie Edwards)
"Godfather Theme" (Nino Rota)
"Shape of My Heart" (Sumner)
"Tamally Maak" (Ahmed Ali Moussa, Sherif Tag)
"Total Eclipse of the Heart" (Jim Steinman)
"Morena de mi Corason" 
"My Heart Will Go On" (James Horner, Will Jennings)

2005 albums